Hesar (also Romanized as Ḩeşār) is a village in Firuraq Rural District, in the Central District of Khoy County, West Azerbaijan Province, Iran. At the 2006 census, its population was 362, in 64 families.

References 

Populated places in Khoy County